Peryevo is a rural locality (a settlement) in Spasskoye Rural Settlement, Vologodsky District, Vologda Oblast, Russia. The population was 718 as of 2002. There are 22 streets.

Geography 
Peryevo is located 22 km southwest of Vologda (the district's administrative centre) by road. Kishkino is the nearest rural locality.

References 

Rural localities in Vologodsky District